The R191 road is a regional road in Ireland, located in County Cavan and County Meath.

References

Regional roads in the Republic of Ireland
Roads in County Cavan
Roads in County Meath